The Pagbilao Power Station is a 1,155-MW coal-fired power station in Pagbilao, Quezon, Philippines.

Situated at Isla Grande, the Pagbilao Power Station began operations in 1993.

The power station was formerly owned by Mirant Philippines and was acquired by TeaM Energy, a joint venture of Japanese firms TEPCO and Marubeni, in 2007.

In December 2014, a 420-MW third unit started operations expanding the capacity of the facility which had a capacity of 735-MW. The third unit was a project of Pagbilao Energy Corporation, a joint venture of Aboitiz Power Corporation and TeaM Energy.

References

Coal-fired power stations in the Philippines
Buildings and structures in Quezon